Fern Crest Village is an unincorporated community in Broward County, Florida, United States. The community is located near the intersection of I-595 and the Turnpike.

Geography

References

 Newspapers.com

Unincorporated communities in Broward County, Florida
Unincorporated communities in Florida
Former municipalities in Florida